The Credit Institutions (Financial Support) Act 2008 is an Act of the Oireachtas (Irish parliament). The Act was a piece of emergency legislation decided on by the Irish Government on Tuesday, 30 September 2008 and enacted on Thursday, 2 October to provide a €440 billion guarantee to six Irish banks to prevent possible collapse as a result of the Financial crisis of 2007–2008

It was unusual in that it was the first time since its foundation that the Irish senate began debate on legislation after midnight, finally passing the bill at 8am on Thursday 2 October.

Background
The decision to introduce the bill was made following Monday 29 September 2008, when the ISEQ fell a record 13%, when a number of banks in Europe were collapsing and the United States congress initially rejected their Emergency Economic Stabilization Act of 2008 and a subsequent record points-value fall in the Dow Jones Industrial Average.

There was a direct positive response on the liquidity markets on the day the bill was announced.

External links
"EU-wide approach needed" Irish Times opinion piece
Oireachtas, 2008 The Houses of the Oireachtas, "Credit Institutions (Financial Support) Act 2008 No.x of 2008, Published: 18 April 2007, Accessed: 25 October 2007

Post-2008 Irish economic downturn
2008 in Irish law
Acts of the Oireachtas of the 2000s
Financial services in the Republic of Ireland